Dharmavarapu Subrahmanyam (20 September 1954 – 7 December 2013) was an Indian actor, comedian and film director who worked in Telugu cinema. He was established as one of the highly paid and top most leading comedians in Telugu film industry. Dharmavarapu had huge fan following among Telugu audience for his unique style and dialogue modulation. He hosted several popular television shows.

Being close to Y. S. Rajasekhara Reddy, Dharmavarapu was a member of the Indian National Congress and worked as chairman of Andhra Pradesh Cultural Association. Dharmavarapu has received two state Nandi Awards for best male comedian for his roles in Alasyam Amrutham (2010) and Yagnam (2004).

Early life
Dharmavarapu was born in a Telugu Brahmin family at Komminenivaripalem in Prakasam district, Andhra Pradesh.

Career
Dharmavarapu originally worked as a government employee. He became popular through his comedy serial "Anando Brahma" which he both acted in and directed. It was aired on Doordarshan in the 1980s becoming a sensational hit show in Andhra Pradesh changing the trend of Television media in entertainment.

His first film appearance was in the Jandhyala-directed Jayammu Nischayammu Raa in 1989. He was renowned for his comedy roles and flawless dialogue delivery.

Later, he went on to act in various films with star heroes like  Chiranjeevi, Balakrishna, Rajinikanth, Nagarjuna, Venkatesh, Mahesh Babu, Pawan Kalyan, Prabhas, Jr. NTR, Ram Charan, Allu Arjun, Ravi Teja. He also directed a Telugu film, Thokaleni Pitta, starring Naresh in the lead produced by Kona Venkat.

Dharmavarpu was a close knit to the then Chief Minister Late Y. S. Rajasekhara Reddy and has been active in the Congress party.

He hosted a political satire program 'Ding Dong' on Sakshi TV from 2011.

Death
Dharmavarapu died on 7 December 2013, after fighting liver cancer for several months.

Filmography

As an actor
{{columns-list|colwidth=22em|
 Bava Bava Panneeru (1989)
 Jayammu Nischayammu Raa (1990)
 Pelli Pustakam (1991)
 Swathi Kiranam (1992)
 Prema Chitram Pelli Vichitram (1993)
 Parugo Parugu (1993)
 Mr. Pellam (1993)
 Ladies Special (1993)
 Ish Gup Chup (1993)
 Pelli Koduku (1994)
 Brahmachari Mogudu (1994)
 Gharana Bullodu (1995)
 Oho Naa Pellanta (1996)
 Aaduthu Paaduthu
 Nuvve Kavali (2000)
 Nuvvu Nenu (2001)
 Anandam (2001)
 Family Circus (2001)
 Nee Sneham (2002)
 Sontham (2002) as Subbu
 Nuvve Nuvve (2002)
 Tappu Chesi Pappu Koodu (2002)
 Sreeram (2002)
 Indra (2002)
 Jayam (2002)
 Dhanalakshmi, I Love You (2002)
 Manmadhudu (2002)
 Aadanthe Ado Type (2003)
 Veede (2003)
 Tagore (2003)
 Piliste Palukutha (2003)
 Palnati Bramhanaidu (2003)
 Goa (2003)
 Okkadu (2003)
 Fools (2003)
 Ammulu (2003)
 Amma Nanna O Tamila Ammayi (2003)
 Vijayam (2003)
 Simhadri (2003)
 Dongodu (2003)
 Vasantham (2003)
 Swetha Naagu (2004)
 Naani (2004)
 New (2004) (Tamil)
 Yagnam (2004)
 Guri (2004)
 Donga Dongadi (2004)
 Varsham (2004)
 Mr & Mrs Sailaja Krishnamurthy (2004)
 Leela Mahal Center (2004)
 Morning Raga (2004)
Love (2004) (Kannada)
 Venky (2004)
 143 (2004)
 Mass (2004)
 Nenunnanu (2004)
123 from Amalapuram (2004)
 Dhana 51 (2005)
 Mannin Maindhan (2005) (Tamil)
 Allari Bullodu (2005)
 Balu ABCDEFG (2005)
 Nuvvostanante Nenoddantana (2005)
 Avunanna Kaadanna (2005)
 Athanokkade (2005)
 Andarivaadu (2005)
 Athadu (2005)
 Andhrudu (2005)
 Veeri Veeri Gummadi Pandu (2005)
 Jai Chiranjeeva (2005)
 Gowtam SSC (2005)
Chennai Kaadhal (2006) (Tamil)
 Style (2006)
 Sri Ramadasu (2006)
 Bangaram (2006)
 Evandoi Srivaru (2006)
 Bommarillu (2006)
 Andala Ramudu (2006)
 Khatarnak (2006)
 Annavaram (2006)
 Operation Duryodhana (2007)
 Shankardada Zindabad (2007)
 Chirutha (2007)
 Siddu From Sikakulam (2008)
 Ullasamga Utsahamga (2008)
 Blade Babji (2008)
 Ready (2008)
 Jalsa (2008)
 Somberi (2008)
 King (2008)
 Pandurangadu (2008)
 Pistha (2009)
 Bendu Apparao R.M.P (2009)
 Bangaru Babu (2009)
 Namo_Venkatesa (2010)
 Darling (2010)
 Mahesh Khaleja (2010)
 Nagavalli (2010)
 Kathi Kantha Rao (2010)
 Simha (2010)
 Chukkalanti Ammayi Chakkanaina Abbayi (2011)
 100% Love (2011)
 Aakasame Haddu (2011)
 Dookudu (2011)
 Madatha Kaja (2011)
 Racha (2012)
 Businessman (2012)
 Bodyguard (2012)
 Sudigadu (2012)
 Shadow (2013)
 Daruvu (2012)
 Cameraman Ganga Tho Rambabu (2012)
 Julai (2012)
 Greeku Veerudu (2013)
 Jabardasth (2013)
 Hum Tum (2013)
 Amrutham Chandamamalo (2014; posthumously released)
 Dillunnodu  (2014; posthumously released)
 Rudramadevi (2015; posthumously released)
}}

As director
 Thokaleni Pitta Aanando''

References

External links
 

1960 births
2013 deaths
Telugu male actors
Indian male comedians
Nandi Award winners
Telugu stand-up comedians
Male actors in Telugu cinema
Indian male film actors
People from Prakasam district
20th-century Indian male actors
Male actors from Andhra Pradesh
21st-century Indian male actors
Telugu film directors
Film directors from Andhra Pradesh